Mylothris lucens is a butterfly in the family Pieridae. It is found in Nigeria.

References

Butterflies described in 2005
Pierini
Endemic fauna of Nigeria
Butterflies of Africa